Dirk Holdorf (born 3 September 1966) is a retired German football player. He spent two seasons in the 2. Bundesliga with Eintracht Braunschweig. After retiring as a player, Holdorf later became business manager at the club and also took over as caretaker manager for a short time in 1998. He was released by the club together with manager Peter Vollmann after a 1–2 defeat against Karlsruher SC during the 2002–03 2. Bundesliga season.

Personal life

Dirk Holdorf is the son of Willi Holdorf, gold medalist in decathlon at the 1964 Summer Olympics.

References

External links
 

1966 births
Living people
German footballers
Association football midfielders
German football managers
Eintracht Braunschweig players
Eintracht Braunschweig managers
Eintracht Braunschweig non-playing staff
2. Bundesliga players